Barrackpur Assembly constituency  is an assembly constituency in North 24 Parganas district in the Indian state of West Bengal.

Overview
As per orders of the Delimitation Commission, No. 108 Barrackpore Assembly constituency is composed of the following: Barrackpore municipality and Titagarh municipality.

Barrackpore Assembly constituency is part of No. 15 Barrackpore (Lok Sabha constituency).

Members of Legislative Assembly

Note:For MLCAs from the area in previous years see Titagarh Assembly constituency.

Election results

2021

2016

2011
In the 2011 election, Silbhadra Dutta of Trinamool Congress defeated his nearest rival Madhusudan Samanta of CPI(M).

References

Assembly constituencies of West Bengal
Politics of North 24 Parganas district
Barrackpore